The Pioneer Award is given by the Science Fiction Research Association to the writer or writers of the best critical essay-length work of the year.

Previous winners:
1990 - Veronica Hollinger, "The Vampire and the Alien: Variations on the Outsider"
1991 - H. Bruce Franklin, "The Vietnam War as American Science Fiction and Fantasy"
1992 - Istvan Csiscery-Ronay Jr., "The SF of Theory: Baudrillard and Haraway"
1993 - No Award
1994 - Larry McCaffery and Takayuki Tatsumi, "Towards the Theoretical Frontiers of Fiction: From Metafiction and Cyberpunk through Avant-Pop"
1995 - Roger Luckhurst, "The Many Deaths of Science Fiction: A Polemic"
1996 - Brian Stableford, "How Should a Science Fiction Story End?"
1997 - John Moore, "Shifting Frontiers: Cyberpunk and the American South"
1998 - I. F. Clarke, "Future—War Fiction: The First Main Phase, 1871-1900"
1999 - Carl Freedman, "Kubrick's 2001 and the Possibility of a Science-Fiction Cinema"
2000 - Wendy Pearson, "Alien Cryptographies: The View from Queer," published in the March 1999 issue of Science Fiction Studies.
2001 - De Witt Douglas Kilgore, "Changing Regimes: Vonda N. McIntyre's Parodic Astrofuturism," published in the July 2000 issue of Science Fiction Studies.
2002 - Judith Berman, "Science Fiction Without the Future," published in the May 2001 issue of The New York Review of Science Fiction
2003 - Lance Olsen, "Omniphage," from the Edging into the Future collection
2004 - Andrew M. Butler, "Thirteen Ways of Looking at the British Boom," published in the November 2003 issue of Science Fiction Studies.
2005 - Lisa Yaszek, "The Women History Doesn't See: Recovering Midcentury Women's SF as a Literature of Social Critique," published in Extrapolation 45(1): 34-51.
2006 - Maria DeRose, "Redefining Women's Power Through Science Fiction," published in Extrapolation 46(1):  66-89.
2007 - Amy J. Ransom, "Oppositional Postcolonialism in Québécois Science Fiction," published in Science-Fiction Studies 33(2):  291-312.
2008 - Sherryl Vint, "Speciesism and Species Being in Do Androids Dream of Electric Sheep?," published in Mosaic:  a Journal for the Interdisciplinary Study of Literature 40(1):  111-126.
2009 - Neil Easterbrook for "Giving an Account of Oneself: Ethics, Alterity, Ai,r"
2010 - Allison de Fren, “The Anatomical Gaze in Tomorrow’s Eve,” published in "Science Fiction Studies" No. 108, Vol. 36 (2), July 2009: 235-265).
2011 - John Rieder, "On Defining SF, or Not," published in Science Fiction Studies 37.2 (July 2010)

References
Science Fiction Research Association website

Academic science fiction awards
Awards established in 1990